Leon Spinks (July 11, 1953 – February 5, 2021) was an American professional boxer who competed from 1977 to 1995. In only his eighth professional fight, he won the undisputed heavyweight championship in 1978 after defeating Muhammad Ali in a split decision, in what is considered one of the biggest upsets in boxing history. Spinks was later stripped of the WBC title for facing Ali in an unapproved rematch seven months later, which he lost by a unanimous decision.

Besides being heavyweight champion and his characteristic gap-toothed grin (due to losing two and later all four of his front teeth), Spinks gained notoriety for the disaster which befell his career following his loss to Ali. However, he did challenge once more for the WBC heavyweight title in 1981 (losing to Larry Holmes by TKO in the third round), and the WBA cruiserweight title in 1986 (losing to Dwight Muhammad Qawi by TKO in the sixth round).

As an amateur, Spinks won numerous medals in the light heavyweight division. The first was bronze at the inaugural 1974 World Championships, followed by silver at the 1975 Pan American Games, and gold at the 1976 Summer Olympics; the latter alongside his brother Michael Spinks, who won middleweight gold. Leon served in the United States Marine Corps from 1973 to 1976, rising to the rank of corporal. He was stationed at Marine Corps Base Camp Lejeune in North Carolina and was on the Marine Corps Boxing Team.

Spinks also had a brief career as a professional wrestler from 1986, 1990 to 1993. He mainly worked for Frontier Martial-Arts Wrestling (FMW) and holding the FMW Brass Knuckles Heavyweight Championship in 1992.

Amateur career
Spinks won three consecutive national AAU light heavyweight championships from 1974 to 1976, the first of which came against future champion Michael Dokes. He was serving in the Marine Corps at the time.

Olympic results
Spinks won the light heavyweight gold medal at the 1976 Summer Olympics in Montreal. He defeated Abdel Latif Fatihi, Anatoliy Klimanov, Ottomar Sachse, and Janusz Gortat en route to the final, where he defeated Sixto Soria to win the gold.

Spinks finished his amateur career with a record of 178–7 with 133 knockouts.

Professional career
Spinks debuted professionally on January 15, 1977, in Las Vegas, Nevada, beating Bob Smith by knockout in five rounds. His next fight was in Liverpool, England, where he beat Peter Freeman by a first-round knockout. Later, he saw an improvement in opposition quality, when he fought Pedro Agosto of Puerto Rico and knocked him out in round one. He then fought Scott LeDoux to a draw and defeated Italian champion Alfio Righetti in a decision.

Spinks vs. Ali

At the time a lower-ranked contender, he made history on February 15, 1978, by decisively beating Muhammad Ali on a 15-round split decision, that was in actuality fairly one-sided, in Las Vegas, Nevada. Spinks won the world heavyweight title in his eighth professional fight, the shortest span in history. The aging Ali had expected an easy fight, but he was out-boxed by Spinks, who did not tire throughout the bout and had Ali ready to fall in the last seconds of the fight. It was one of the few occasions when Ali left the ring with a bruised and puffy face.

The victory over Ali was the peak of Spinks' career. He was the only man to take a title from Muhammad Ali in the ring, as Ali's other losses were non-title contests or bouts where Ali was the challenger. Spinks' gap-toothed grin was featured on the cover of the February 19, 1978 issue of Sports Illustrated.

However, Spinks was stripped of his world title by the WBC for refusing to defend it against Ken Norton, instead agreeing to a return bout against Ali to defend his WBA crown. The title, stripped from Spinks, was then awarded to Norton.

Rematch

His second match with Ali, at the Louisiana Superdome on September 15, 1978, went badly for Spinks. A now-in-shape Ali—with better, sharper tactics—rarely lost control, winning back his title by a unanimous fifteen-round decision. Ali regained the title, becoming the first three-time lineal heavyweight champion. Spinks was never given a rematch; Ali retired after the fight (although he came out of retirement a few years later to fight Larry Holmes and Trevor Berbick).

Career development

Spinks's next fight, his only one in 1979, was at Monte Carlo, where he was knocked out in the first round by future WBA world heavyweight champion Gerrie Coetzee. In the following fight, Spinks defeated former world title challenger and European title holder Alfredo Evangelista by a knockout in round 5. He then fought to a draw in with Eddie López, scored a knockout over Kevin Isaac in May, and, in October, beat the WBC's top-ranked challenger, Bernardo Mercado, by a knockout in round nine on the undercard of Muhammad Ali vs. Larry Holmes.

His strong performance against Mercado earned Spinks a title match against Larry Holmes. In Spinks' only fight in 1981, on June 12 and what would be his last opportunity to win the heavyweight title, he took multiple punches without responding in the third round and the referee stopped the  fight.

Move to cruiserweight
It was Spinks' last heavyweight bout for years, as he began boxing in the cruiserweight division. He beat contender Ivy Brown by a decision in ten rounds, and gained a decision against former and future title challenger Jesse Burnett in twelve rounds.

Spinks was due to face the World Cruiserweight number one David Pearce, but the fight was called off on 24 hours notice after the fighters had both weighed in, due to the BBBoC stance on Pearce fighting abroad in the newly formed Cruiserweight division.

When his brother Michael Spinks defeated Larry Holmes in a controversial upset for the IBF heavyweight championship in 1985, they became the only brothers to have held world heavyweight championships. They kept the distinction until the Klitschko brothers became champions two decades later.

In the 1980s Leon Spinks competed in several boxer vs. wrestler matches in New Japan Pro-Wrestling (NJPW), including losing by submission to Antonio Inoki. In 1986 Spinks earned his last championship opportunity, fighting Dwight Muhammad Qawi for the WBA cruiserweight championship. Qawi had been defeated by Michael Spinks three years earlier for his WBC light heavyweight championship. However, Leon lost by TKO in the sixth round.

Spinks boxed for another eight years with mixed results. In 1994 he lost a bout by KO to John Carlo, the first time a former heavyweight champion had lost to a boxer making his pro debut (promoter Charles Farrell later admitted to falsifying Carlo's record in order to get the fight sanctioned by the District of Columbia). Spinks retired at age 42, after losing an 8-round decision to Fred Houpe in 1995, who was coming off a seventeen-year hiatus.

Professional Wrestling Career
On October 9, 1986 Spinks lost to Japanese legend Antonio Inoki in a mixed martial arts fight for New Japan Pro Wrestling. Spinks made an appearance for the United States Wrestling Association on June 25, 1990 where he lost to Jerry Lawler by disqualification. 

In 1991, Spinks made his debut in Japan for Frontier Martial-Arts Wrestling (FMW) teaming with fellow boxer Rufus Blackborn. He later teamed with Dr. Luther in 1992. On March 25, 1992 he defeated Tarzan Goto for the FMW Brass Knuckles Heavyweight Championship. He would drop the title to Atsushi Onita on May 24, 1992. In 1993, he feuded with Terry Funk and retired from wrestling later that year.

Life after boxing
During the 1990s, Spinks worked for Frontier Martial-Arts Wrestling, winning its world title in 1992, making him only the second man (after Primo Carnera) to hold titles in both boxing and wrestling. In the late 1990s, Spinks was a headliner on year-round, touring autograph shows.

In 2009, Spinks was featured as part of the 2009 documentary Facing Ali, in which notable former opponents of Ali speak about how fighting Ali changed their lives.

Spinks lived later in his life in Las Vegas, Nevada. He told a reporter his life was "comfortable", and that he kept a low profile.

In August 2017, Leon was inducted into the Nevada Boxing Hall of Fame along with his brother, Michael.

Personal life and health
Spinks was born and raised in St. Louis.

Leon's son, Cory Spinks, held the undisputed welterweight title, and was the IBF junior middleweight champion twice.

In 1990, Leon's other son, Leon Calvin, was shot to death in East St. Louis as he was driving home from his girlfriend's house. Calvin was an aspiring light heavyweight pro boxer with a record of 2–0, with the two pro bouts occurring only a month before he died. Leon's grandson and Calvin's son, Leon Spinks III, is an aspiring light heavyweight southpaw boxer with a pro record of 11–3–1 with seven knockouts, his last outing being a six-round draw with Robbie Cannon in October 2017.

Spinks perceptibly slurred his words after his active boxing days, and was diagnosed in 2012 with shrinkage in his brain, which doctors said was likely caused by the accumulated punches that he took during his career. In 2011, Spinks and his wife Brenda moved to Las Vegas. Spinks was hospitalized twice in 2014 in a Las Vegas hospital for surgery due to abdominal problems, from which he recovered.

In 2019, it was revealed that Spinks was diagnosed with advanced prostate cancer. He died at a hospital in Henderson, Nevada on February 5, 2021, at age 67.

Professional boxing record

See also
List of heavyweight boxing champions
List of undisputed world boxing champions
List of WBC world champions
List of WBC world champions
List of The Ring world champions
Notable boxing families

References

Further reading

External links

 
 Leon Spinks—CBZ Profile
 
 

1953 births
2021 deaths
20th-century African-American sportspeople
20th-century professional wrestlers
21st-century African-American people
AIBA World Boxing Championships medalists
African-American boxers
American male boxers
American military Olympians
Boxers at the 1975 Pan American Games
Boxers at the 1976 Summer Olympics
Boxers from St. Louis
Cruiserweight boxers
Deaths from cancer in Nevada
Deaths from prostate cancer
FMW Brass Knuckles Heavyweight Champions
Light-heavyweight boxers
Medalists at the 1975 Pan American Games
Medalists at the 1976 Summer Olympics
Military personnel from St. Louis
Olympic boxers of the United States
Olympic gold medalists for the United States in boxing
Pan American Games medalists in boxing
Pan American Games silver medalists for the United States
People from Addison, Illinois
People from Columbus, Nebraska
The Ring (magazine) champions
United States Marines
Winners of the United States Championship for amateur boxers
World Boxing Association champions
World Boxing Council champions
World heavyweight boxing champions